Sttellla  is a Belgian rock band named after Stella Artois Beer.  They formed in 1978 in Brussels.  The lead singer is Jean-Luc Fonck.

Discography

Main releases, including live and compilation albums:

 A.B. Rose, (CD and DVD Live) 2008
 Torremolinos, 2008
 Le plus beau jour de magie, 2006
 Double, (CD and DVD) 2003
 Un homme avec un grand H au pays des prises de têtes, 2001
 Il faut tourner l'Apache, 1998
 Sttellla Live, 1997
 Consttelllation, (compilation) 1997
 The dark side of the moule, 1995
 Le meilleur du best of des plus grand greatest hits de Sttellla, (compilation) 1993
 Manneken pis not war / Faisez la mouche, pas la guêpe, 1992
 L'avenir est à ceux qui s'éléphanteau, 1990
 Sttellla (compilation) 1989
 Fuite au prochain lavabo, (LP) 1986
 Pouet-pouette (LP) 1978

External links
Official Sttellla Fan Site
Sttellla - The Belgian Pop & Rock Archive

Belgian rock music groups
Musical groups established in 1978